Colossal Pictures (also styled as (Colossal) Pictures or (C)P) was an entertainment company that developed and produced television programming, advertising, network branding, and visual effects. Colossal's work has won every major industry award, from the Clio, Emmy, and Grammy Awards to the Cannes Gold Lion and Academy of Interactive Arts & Sciences Top Honor.

History 
In the mid-1970s, Drew Takahashi and Gary Gutierrez were working with John Korty on animated shorts for children's programs such as Vegetable Soup. When Vegetable Soup was renewed for a second season, Korty began working on a movie, and suggested to Drew and Gary that they start their own production company. The two founded Colossal Pictures in 1976 and worked on projects such as shorts for Vegetable Soup, the opening sequence of The Grateful Dead Movie and commercials for Boise Cascade, KQED, KSAN-FM, and Gap Inc. The Boise Cascade commercial received national attention and attracted many businesses to Colossal.

In 1981, Colossal began producing dozens of network IDs for MTV, which led to the company receiving more high-profile clients including Nickelodeon, Levi's, and Coca-Cola. The following year, Gary Gutierrez launched USFX, a new division of Colossal, while he was working on The Right Stuff. Colossal started producing computer animation in 1983, when they collaborated with Pacific Data Images to produce a commercial for the Atari game Joust and a network ID for MTV. In 1986, Colossal began working with Western Images using a Quantel Harry unit, resulting in Colossal being able to create state-of-the-art computer graphics. Colossal also launched a new division, BIG Pictures, which produced television programs. In January 1989, New York City production company Noyes & Laybourne became Colossal's East Coast division. In September, Colossal began representing Pixar to produce CGI-animated commercials. As part of the deal, Colossal would receive a project and develop the storyboards, while Pixar animated the project. Colossal terminated its relationship with Pixar in 1992 when they started production on Toy Story for Walt Disney Pictures.

During the early 1990s, well-known artists like Caroline Leaf and Henry Selick were hired to direct commercials at Colossal. In 1991, Colossal began representing Sculptoons and the Brothers Quay, but their relationships with Colossal did not last very long. That same year,  after Colossal's relationship with Pixar ended in 1992, Stuart Cudlitz and Brad DeGraf launched a new digital media division, which produced projects such as The Moxy Show, RoboCop: The Ride, and a Living Books game. Colossal closed BIG Pictures in 1994; that October, Colossal employees John Hays, Phil Robinson, and Jeff Fino left the company and launched a new animation studio, Wild Brain.

Earlier in 1994, Colossal created exhibits for the Rock and Roll Hall of Fame. Due to cost overruns, production delays and other problems, the museum refused to pay all of Colossal's bills. In April 1996, Colossal laid off a third of its staff, including co-founder Gary Gutierrez, and on May 30, the company filed for Chapter 11 bankruptcy. Colossal sued the Rock and Roll Hall of Fame for $1,200,000 in damages plus $10,000,000 in punitive damages. That year, Colossal signed a development deal with the Disney Channel to produce content for the network. Colossal produced the interstitial series Frankenguy and the Professor and The Mix-Ups plus the Zoog Disney block for the Disney Channel. After Colossal decided to restructure itself into a smaller company, consolidating all of its activities into one building in the process, they emerged from Chapter 11 bankruptcy on December 1, 1997. Jamie Hyneman, manager of Colossal's model shop, took over the facility and turned it into M5 Industries.

Although Colossal was able to sustain itself the following year with a lean work force, the company experienced a downturn in revenue at the beginning of 1999. On August 31, Colossal closed after 23 years in business. The decision was made in order to liquidate property and honor outstanding debts. Many of Colossal's employees, such as Ed Bell, Charlie Canfield, and George Evelyn moved to Wild Brain as a result.

Work

Filmography

Noyes and Laybourne

Formerly known as Cyclops Films (1969–1978) and Eliott Noyes Productions (1978–1983).

Music videos
 "Calling All Girls" (Hilly Michaels, 1980)
 "Get It On (Bang a Gong)" (The Power Station, 1985)
 "Raspberry Beret" (Prince, 1985)
 "All Around the World" (Robert Palmer, 1985)
 "Color of Success" (Morris Day, 1985)
 "Mutual Surrender (What a Wonderful World)" (Bourgeois Tagg, 1986)
 "Partners, Brothers and Friends" (Nitty Gritty Dirt Band, 1986)
 "Touch of Grey" (Grateful Dead, 1987)
 "Airhead" (Thomas Dolby, 1988)
 "Don't Worry, Be Happy" (Bobby McFerrin, 1988)
 "Good Lovin'" (Bobby McFerrin, 1988)
 "Istanbul (Not Constantinople)" (They Might Be Giants, 1990)
 "Living in the Promiseland" (Joe Cocker, 1990)
 "The Garden" (Bobby McFerrin, 1990)
 Kevin Volans: Hunting:Gathering (Kronos Quartet, 1991)
 "Steam" (Peter Gabriel, 1993)
 "Get a Haircut" (George Thorogood, 1993)
 "George of the Jungle" (Presidents of the United States of America, 1997)

Commercials

1-800-MUSIC-NOW (1995)
7Up (1985, 1995)
ABC (1985)
Adventure Island (1987)
Allstate (1990–95)
Americast
American Express (1991)
Ascriptin
Atari (1983)
AT&T (1991)
Bankers Trust (1993)
BellSouth
Best Buy (1994)
Blockbuster Video (1998)
Bloomingdale's (1985)
Boise Cascade (1980)
Budweiser
Burger King (1996)
Cadbury
California Federal Bank 
California Lottery (1990)
California Milk Advisory Board (1985, 1989)
Cap'n Crunch
Carl's Jr. (1993)
Cartoon Network (1992, 1998)
CBS
C.C. Lemon (1995)
Celestial Seasonings (1995)
Century Theatres
Channel V (1994)
Chevrolet
Chili's
Chuck E. Cheese (1970s)
Cigna (1985)
Clorox (1985)
Coca-Cola (1993–98)
Cocoa Krispies (1987–88)
Converse
Coors Brewing Company
Del Monte Foods (1985)
Denny's (1997)
DHL
Discovery Channel (1997)
Disney Channel (1986–90, 1992)
Dole Food Company (1985)
Dr. Scholl's
ESPN2 (1993)
Final Fantasy III (1994)
Ford
Fox Kids Network (1991)
Franco-American (1996)
Fresca (1993)
Frito-Lay
Gap Inc. (1981)
General Mills (1986, 1990, 1992–94)
Geo (1989)
Good Guys (1993)
GTE
Ha! (1990)
Haggar
Hanna-Barbera
Hawaiian Punch (1995)
HBO (1984)
Heineken (1992)
Hershey's Kisses (1989–96)
Hitachi (1993)
Hi-C (1993)
Homebase (1992)
Home Club
Hewlett-Packard (1992)
Honda (1990, 1993, 1995)
JCPenney
Jeep (1994)
Keds (1994)
KGO-TV (1983)
Kibbles 'n Bits (1989)
Kikkoman
KSAN-FM (1979)
L'eggs (1985)
Le Méridien
Levi's (1981, 1983–86, 1991, 1994–95)
Liberty Mutual
Life Savers (1990–91)
Lifetime (1985)
Listerine (1990–92)
Little Caesars
Locomotion (1996)
Löwenbräu Brewery (1989)
Mainstay (1995)
MCI Communications
McDonald's (1986–87, 1989–90)
Miller's Outpost (1993)
Mirinda (1985)
Mobilink
Motorola (1994)
Mountain Dew
The Movie Channel (1985)
MSN
MSNBC
MTV (1981–86, 1990–93)
Mrs. Baird's
Nabisco (1990, 1993)
Nature Valley
NBA
NBC (1986–87)
New Visions Pictures (1989)
Nickelodeon (1984–85, 1994–96, 1998)
Nick at Nite (1989, 1991)
Nike (1991–95, 1997)
Nintendo Power (1988)
NYNEX (1992–93)
Ocean Spray (1984)
Office Depot (1997)
Old Navy (1998–99)
Owens Corning (1996)
Pacific Bell (1985)
Pacific Telesis (1985)
Partnership for a Drug-Free America (1992, 1999)
PBS
Pep Boys (1999)
Pepsi (1993, 1996)
Perrier (1995)
Pillsbury Company (1988, 1990)
Pizza Hut (1985, 1991–97)
PG&E
Playskool
Post Holdings (1985, 1991–92, 1999)
Procter & Gamble (1989–90)
Prudential
RCA (1985)
Saab Automobile (1995–96)
Samsung (1998)
Schweppes (1995)
Sega (1992–94)
Showtime (1987)
Six Flags (1992)
Sprint Corporation (1998)
Starbucks Coffee (1995)
Straw Hat Pizza (1985)
Southwestern Bell (1986, 1994)
Stroh Brewery Company
Supercuts
Taco Bell
Tagamet
TBS
Tetris & Dr. Mario (1994)
TNT (1990)
Tott's
Touchstone Pictures
Toys "R" Us (1991)
Trident (1985, 1990)
Tropicana (1989, 1991)
Turner Classic Movies (1996)
Twizzlers
United Airlines (1996)
Universal Studios Florida (1990)
U.S. Navy (1994)
Vestron, Inc.
VH1 (1985)
Vlasic Pickles (1989)
Wachovia Bank
WebTV

Noyes and Laybourne

Apple Cinnamon Cheerios (1989)
Bubble Yum (1992)
Burger King (1989)
Cigna
Ha! (1990)
Honeycomb (1991; with Colossal Pictures)
IBM
K'NEX (1994)
Kool-Aid
Metro-North/Long Island Rail Road
Nickelodeon (1984–85, 1987)
Nick at Nite (1987–88)
Nikon (1990)
Ripple Crisp (1994; with Colossal Pictures)
T.G. Bearwich (1992)

References

External links 
 Archive of Colossal Pictures website
 1993 demo reel
 1994 demo reel
 1996 demo reel
 1998 demo reel

American animation studios
Television production companies of the United States
Entertainment companies based in California
Companies based in San Francisco
Entertainment companies established in 1976
Mass media companies established in 1976
Mass media companies disestablished in 1999
1976 establishments in California
1999 establishments in California